Sergio Abramo (born 29 March 1958) is an Italian politician and entrepreneur. He is member of the Forza Italia. He was born in Catanzaro, Italy.

References 

Living people
1958 births
People from Catanzaro
Forza Italia (2013) politicians
21st-century Italian politicians
Mayors of places in Calabria
Presidents of the Province of Catanzaro